The 2012 Star World Championships were held in Hyères, France between May 5 and 11, 2012. The hosting yacht club was COYCH.

Results

References

External links
 

Star World Championships
Star World Championship
Sailing competitions in France